The 5th constituency of Puy-de-Dôme is a French legislative constituency in Puy-de-Dôme.  It covers the east of the department, and has been held by André Chassaigne of the French Communist Party since 2002.

Historic representation

Election results

2022

 
 
|-
| colspan="8" bgcolor="#E9E9E9"|
|-

2017

|- style="background-color:#E9E9E9;text-align:center;"
! colspan="2" rowspan="2" style="text-align:left;" | Candidate
! rowspan="2" colspan="2" style="text-align:left;" | Party
! colspan="2" | 1st round
! colspan="2" | 2nd round
|- style="background-color:#E9E9E9;text-align:center;"
! width="75" | Votes
! width="30" | %
! width="75" | Votes
! width="30" | %
|-
| style="background-color:" |
| style="text-align:left;" | André Chassaigne
| style="text-align:left;" | Communist Party
| PCF
| 
| 34.85
| 
| 63.55
|-
| style="background-color:" |
| style="text-align:left;" | Sébastien Gardette
| style="text-align:left;" | La République En Marche!
| LREM
| 
| 29.27
| 
| 36.45
|-
| style="background-color:" |
| style="text-align:left;" | Jérôme Jayet
| style="text-align:left;" | National Front
| FN
| 
| 9.95
| colspan="2" style="text-align:left;" |
|-
| style="background-color:" |
| style="text-align:left;" | Myriam Fougère
| style="text-align:left;" | The Republicans
| LR
| 
| 9.68
| colspan="2" style="text-align:left;" |
|-
| style="background-color:" |
| style="text-align:left;" | Sara Perret
| style="text-align:left;" | La France Insoumise
| FI
| 
| 6.82
| colspan="2" style="text-align:left;" |
|-
| style="background-color:" |
| style="text-align:left;" | Gérard Betenfeld
| style="text-align:left;" | Socialist Party
| PS
| 
| 3.22
| colspan="2" style="text-align:left;" |
|-
| style="background-color:" |
| style="text-align:left;" | Jérémy Prévost
| style="text-align:left;" | Debout la France
| DLF
| 
| 1.60
| colspan="2" style="text-align:left;" |
|-
| style="background-color:" |
| style="text-align:left;" | Claire Lespagnol
| style="text-align:left;" | Ecologist
| ECO
| 
| 1.35
| colspan="2" style="text-align:left;" |
|-
| style="background-color:" |
| style="text-align:left;" | Mikaël Montagnon
| style="text-align:left;" | Ecologist
| ECO
| 
| 1.26
| colspan="2" style="text-align:left;" |
|-
| style="background-color:" |
| style="text-align:left;" | Florence Dinouard
| style="text-align:left;" | Union of Democrats and Independents
| UDI
| 
| 0.94
| colspan="2" style="text-align:left;" |
|-
| style="background-color:" |
| style="text-align:left;" | Jeannine Laubreton
| style="text-align:left;" | Independent
| DIV
| 
| 0.60
| colspan="2" style="text-align:left;" |
|-
| style="background-color:" |
| style="text-align:left;" | Gabrielle Capron
| style="text-align:left;" | Far Left
| EXG
| 
| 0.45
| colspan="2" style="text-align:left;" |
|-
| colspan="8" style="background-color:#E9E9E9;"|
|- style="font-weight:bold"
| colspan="4" style="text-align:left;" | Total
| 
| 100%
| 
| 100%
|-
| colspan="8" style="background-color:#E9E9E9;"|
|-
| colspan="4" style="text-align:left;" | Registered voters
| 
| style="background-color:#E9E9E9;"|
| 
| style="background-color:#E9E9E9;"|
|-
| colspan="4" style="text-align:left;" | Blank/Void ballots
| 
| 1.73%
| 
| 5.52%
|-
| colspan="4" style="text-align:left;" | Turnout
| 
| 52.77%
| 
| 49.97%
|-
| colspan="4" style="text-align:left;" | Abstentions
| 
| 47.23%
| 
| 50.03%
|-
| colspan="8" style="background-color:#E9E9E9;"|
|- style="font-weight:bold"
| colspan="6" style="text-align:left;" | Result
| colspan="2" style="background-color:" | PCF GAIN FROM FG
|}

2012

|- style="background-color:#E9E9E9;text-align:center;"
! colspan="2" rowspan="2" style="text-align:left;" | Candidate
! rowspan="2" colspan="2" style="text-align:left;" | Party
! colspan="2" | 1st round
! colspan="2" | 2nd round
|- style="background-color:#E9E9E9;text-align:center;"
! width="75" | Votes
! width="30" | %
! width="75" | Votes
! width="30" | %
|-
| style="background-color:" |
| style="text-align:left;" | André Chassaigne
| style="text-align:left;" | Left Front
| FG
| 
| 41.16
| 
| 67.53
|-
| style="background-color:" |
| style="text-align:left;" | Maxime Costilhes
| style="text-align:left;" | Union for a Popular Movement
| UMP
| 
| 20.03
| 
| 32.47
|-
| style="background-color:" |
| style="text-align:left;" | Martine Munoz
| style="text-align:left;" | Socialist Party
| PS
| 
| 18.44
| colspan="2" style="text-align:left;" |
|-
| style="background-color:" |
| style="text-align:left;" | Erik Faurot
| style="text-align:left;" | National Front
| FN
| 
| 12.66
| colspan="2" style="text-align:left;" |
|-
| style="background-color:" |
| style="text-align:left;" | Michel Sauvade
| style="text-align:left;" | Democratic Movement
| MoDem
| 
| 3.43
| colspan="2" style="text-align:left;" |
|-
| style="background-color:" |
| style="text-align:left;" | Hubert Constancias
| style="text-align:left;" | Europe Ecology – The Greens
| EELV
| 
| 1.57
| colspan="2" style="text-align:left;" |
|-
| style="background-color:" |
| style="text-align:left;" | Patricia Gerbaud
| style="text-align:left;" | Radical Party
| PR
| 
| 0.76
| colspan="2" style="text-align:left;" |
|-
| style="background-color:" |
| style="text-align:left;" | Philippe De Freitas
| style="text-align:left;" | Le Trèfle
| LT
| 
| 0.65
| colspan="2" style="text-align:left;" |
|-
| style="background-color:" |
| style="text-align:left;" | Sandrine Clavières
| style="text-align:left;" | Communist Party
| NPA
| 
| 0.46
| colspan="2" style="text-align:left;" |
|-
| style="background-color:" |
| style="text-align:left;" | Michèle Decombas
| style="text-align:left;" | Independent Ecological Alliance
| AEI
| 
| 0.45
| colspan="2" style="text-align:left;" |
|-
| style="background-color:" |
| style="text-align:left;" | Gabrielle Capron
| style="text-align:left;" | Worker’s Struggle
| LO
| 
| 0.38
| colspan="2" style="text-align:left;" |
|-
| colspan="8" style="background-color:#E9E9E9;"|
|- style="font-weight:bold"
| colspan="4" style="text-align:left;" | Total
| 
| 100%
| 
| 100%
|-
| colspan="8" style="background-color:#E9E9E9;"|
|-
| colspan="4" style="text-align:left;" | Registered voters
| 
| style="background-color:#E9E9E9;"|
| 
| style="background-color:#E9E9E9;"|
|-
| colspan="4" style="text-align:left;" | Blank/Void ballots
| 
| 1.73%
| 
| 3.71%
|-
| colspan="4" style="text-align:left;" | Turnout
| 
| 60.42%
| 
| 57.14%
|-
| colspan="4" style="text-align:left;" | Abstentions
| 
| 39.58%
| 
| 42.86%
|-
| colspan="8" style="background-color:#E9E9E9;"|
|- style="font-weight:bold"
| colspan="6" style="text-align:left;" | Result
| colspan="2" style="background-color:" | FG HOLD
|}

References

External links 
Results of legislative elections since 1958

5